Ai no Uta is the first studio album by , released on 1 February 2006.

Track listing

fairy

References
Official Discography of Ai Nonaka

2006 albums
Ai Nonaka albums